Kornél Késmárki (28 October 1903 – 1965) was a Hungarian athlete. He competed in the men's high jump at the 1928 Summer Olympics.

References

1903 births
1965 deaths
Athletes (track and field) at the 1928 Summer Olympics
Hungarian male high jumpers
Olympic athletes of Hungary
Place of birth missing
20th-century Hungarian people